

Events
 313 – Emperor Constantine issues the Edict of Milan, legislating toleration of Christian worship in the Roman Empire.  The 4th century sees the construction of many churches, especially in Rome (see below), and in the eastern empire.

Buildings and structures

Buildings

 Early – Church of St. George, Sofia (Serdica) is probably completed.
 303 – Arch of Galerius in Thessaloniki (Macedonia) is dedicated.
 306 – Rotunda of Galerius in Thessaloniki is built.
 c.310 – Aula Palatina (Basilica of Constantine) at Trier is built.
 312–315 – Arch of Constantine in Rome is built.
 c.326–380 – Church of the Holy Sepulchre in Jerusalem (including Anastasis Rotunda).
 368 – Valens Aqueduct in Constantinople is completed.
 From 382 – San Nazaro in Brolo (Basilica Apostolorum) in Milan is begun by Ambrose.
 386 – Basilica of Sant'Ambrogio (Basilica Martyrum) in Milan, built by Ambrose, is consecrated.
 c.390s – Kasagh Basilica in Armenia is built.
 393 – The Forum of Theodosius in Constantinople, reconstructed over the Forum Tauri, is inaugurated.
 Dadhimati Mata Temple in Rajasthan is built.

Churches in Rome

 San Marcello al Corso (309)
 Santi Quattro Coronati (314)
 Old St. Peter's Basilica (324)
 Basilica di San Giovanni in Laterano (324)
 Santa Croce in Gerusalemme (325)
 Santa Susanna (330)
 Basilica di San Marco (336)
 Basilica di Sant'Anastasia al Palatino (early 4th century)
 Santa Costanza (c. 350)
 Santa Maria in Trastevere (early 4th century)
 Santi Nereo e Achilleo (before 377)
 San Lorenzo in Damaso (380)
 Basilica of Saint Paul Outside the Walls (Basilica di San Paolo fuori le Mura) (386)
 Santi Giovanni e Paolo (398)
 San Sisto Vecchio (late 4th century)
 Basilica di San Clemente
 San Lorenzo in Lucina
 Santi Marcellino e Pietro al Laterano
 Santa Pudenziana (4th century)
 San Sebastiano fuori le mura
 Basilica di San Vitale (400)

See also
3rd century in architecture
5th century in architecture
Timeline of architecture

References

Architecture